Irishtown is a locality near Castlemaine, Victoria, Australia. It is noted for heritage sites associated with the Victorian Gold Rush, near or within the Castlemaine Diggings National Heritage Park. These include the Red Hill hydraulic gold sluicing site and the Burying Flat Cemetery, also known as Deadmans Gully Burial Ground.

History
A rush began to New Year's Flat on Fryers Creek on New Years Day, 1853. The rush was described by a digger as "the most animated sight of those stirring times that I ever witnessed". The  settlement arose nearby, and the Shamrock Hotel, an establishment reportedly frequented by "wild men" was subsequently built on the Vaughan Road.  A Catholic church was consecrated in 1865, the building existing until 1956 when it was demolished.

References

Towns in Victoria (Australia)
Populated places established in 1853
Ghost towns in Victoria (Australia)